Jacqueline Nana A. D. Agyepong (born 5 January 1969, in London) is a retired English athlete who competed in the 100 metres hurdles. She represented Great Britain at the 1992 and 1996 Summer Olympics, as well as two outdoor and two indoor World Championships. In addition, she won the silver medal at the 1994 Commonwealth Games.

Her personal bests are 12.93 seconds in the 100 metres hurdles (+1.4 m/s, Lausanne 1994) and 8.01 seconds in the 60 metres hurdles (Barcelona 1995).

Agyepong is a sister of the triple jumper Francis Agyepong, and is sister-in-law of the long jumper Mary Berkeley.

Competition record

References

1969 births
Living people
Athletes from London
English female hurdlers
British female hurdlers
Athletes (track and field) at the 1992 Summer Olympics
Athletes (track and field) at the 1994 Commonwealth Games
Athletes (track and field) at the 1996 Summer Olympics
Olympic athletes of Great Britain
Commonwealth Games medallists in athletics
Commonwealth Games silver medallists for England
Competitors at the 1994 Goodwill Games
Medallists at the 1994 Commonwealth Games